Zapuže pri Ribnici is a village in the hills north of Ribnica in southern Slovenia. The area is part of the traditional region of Lower Carniola and is now included in the Southeast Slovenia Statistical Region.

Name
The name of the settlement was changed from Zapuže to Zapuže pri Ribnici in 1953.

Church
A church built on the Little Mountain chain east of the village is dedicated to Saint Anne and belongs to the Parish of Ribnica. It was first mentioned in written documents dating to 1576, but was rebuilt in 1623 and in the 19th century. Its main altar dates to 1889. The church is built on the site of a prehistoric structure. In the Middle Ages, the church was fortified to serve as a refuge during Ottoman attacks.

References

External links

Zapuže pri Ribnici on Geopedia

Populated places in the Municipality of Ribnica